Corilla beddomeae is a species of air-breathing land snail, a terrestrial pulmonate gastropod mollusk in the family Corillidae.

The specific name beddomeae is in honor of British naturalist Richard Henry Beddome.

Distribution
Distribution of Corilla beddomeae includes Sri Lanka.

References

External links

Corillidae
Gastropods described in 1875
Taxa named by Sylvanus Charles Thorp Hanley